Beaux-parents is a 2019 French comedy directed by Héctor Cabello Reyes.

Cast
 Josiane Balasko as Coline Rossi
 Didier Bourdon as André Rossi
 Bénabar as Harold Becker
 Charlie Bruneau as Garance Rossi
 Bruno Salomone as Hervé Fleury
 Frédéric Bouraly as Lopez
 Gwendolyn Gourvenec as Chloé Fleury
 Ruggero Raimondi as Grandfather

References

External links 
 

2019 films
French comedy films
2010s French films